Grave Dancers Union is the sixth studio album by American alternative rock band Soul Asylum and was released in 1992. The album spent 76 weeks on the US Billboard music charts and was certified triple-platinum in 1993, establishing Soul Asylum as one of the most successful rock groups of the first half of the 1990s.

Overview
During recording of Grave Dancers Union, producer Michael Beinhorn grew dissatisfied with drummer Grant Young's performance and brought in Sterling Campbell. He and Campbell would each wind up playing on half the record. Due to the band's reluctance to admit that a session musician was involved in the album's recording, Campbell was credited as "percussionist." Young would continue as the band's drummer for touring duties after the album was released, until he was dismissed and officially replaced by Campbell prior to the recording of their next album, Let Your Dim Light Shine.

The single "Runaway Train", released in June 1993, reached number five on the Billboard Hot 100 and won a Grammy Award for best rock song in 1994. Though the album had sold moderately well to that point, the breakout success of that single was a major factor in the album's eventual multi-platinum sales figures.

The album cover features a photograph by Czech photographer Jan Saudek titled "Fate Descends Towards the River Leading Two Innocent Children", which was taken in 1970.

The album's title comes from the line "I tried to dance at a funeral, New Orleans style, I joined the Grave Dancers Union, I had to file", from the song "Without a Trace".

Track listing

Personnel

Soul Asylum

 Dave Pirner – lead vocals, rhythm guitar
 Dan Murphy – lead guitar, backing vocals
 Karl Mueller – bass
 Grant Young – drums

Additional musicians
 Sterling Campbell – percussion
 Booker T. Jones III – Hammond organ
 Kraig Johnson, Gary Louris – backing vocals
 Meridian String Quartet – strings
 Sonny Kompanek – arranger, conductor

Production
 Michael Beinhorn – arranger, celeste, glockenspiel, producer, horn arrangements
 Chris Shaw - engineer
 Eric Anderson, Bruce Ross – additional engineering
 David Michael Dill, Dan Gellert, Bill Smith  – assistant engineers
 Andy Wallace – mixing
 David Leonard – mixing of "The Sun Maid"
 Steve Sisco – mixing assistant
 Wally Traugott – mastering
 Francesca Restrepo – art direction, design
 Jan Saudek – photography

Charts

Weekly charts

Year-end charts

Singles

Certifications

References

Soul Asylum albums
1992 albums
Columbia Records albums
Albums produced by Michael Beinhorn